Bugge is a Norwegian surname and may refer to:

People
 Bugge Wesseltoft (born 1964), Norwegian jazz musician
 David Buggé (born 1956), English cricketer and banker
 Peder Olivarius Bugge (1764–1849), Norwegian bishop
 Sophus Bugge (1833–1907), a Norwegian philologist 
 Thomas Bugge (astronomer) (1740–1815), Danish astronomer
 Thomas Bugge, Norwegian musician in the pop and rap duo Robin og Bugge

Other uses
 Bugge Islands, Antarctica